Sovereign Trains was a rolling stock company (ROSCO) formed in 2007 as part of the same group as Grand Central. The company was initially formed to fund the purchase of rolling stock for Grand Central for its operations between London King's Cross and Sunderland, which Grand Central leased from Sovereign. This amounted to six Class 43 power cars and 24 Mark 3 coaches to form three complete trains. However in 2007, Sovereign entered into a partnership with Chinese manufacturer CSR Ziyang to market their new range of trains in Europe, with Grand Central committing to operate the Polaris DEMU, should its track-access agreement be extended.

In 2010, Sovereign Trains sold its three HST sets to Angel Trains, which then leased the sets back to Grand Central.

References

British companies established in 2007
Post-privatisation British railway companies
Railway companies established in 2007
Railway companies disestablished in 2010
Rolling stock leasing companies
2007 establishments in England
2010 disestablishments in England